The coat of arms of Burundi, adopted in 1966, consists of a shield surrounded by three spears.  On the shield is the motto of the nation, as well as the head of a lion.  Behind the shield there are three crossed traditional African spears.  Under the shield the national motto of Burundi appears on a scroll: Unité, Travail, Progrès (French: "Unity, Work, Progress").

Official description 
The constitution of Burundi describes the coat of arms as follows:

The motto of Burundi is "Unité, Travail, Progrès". The emblem of the Republic is a shield charged with a head of a lion, together with three spears, the whole surrounded by the national motto.

History 

The previous coat of arms of the Kingdom of Burundi, used from 1962 until 1966, looked very similar, except that the royal karyenda drum was surmounted on the top as a symbol of the mwami (king), surrounded by two laurels. The number of spears was four. The national motto was Ganza Sabwa, which is in Kirundi and roughly means "(the mwami) rules and reigns".

References 

National symbols of Burundi
Burundi
Burundi
Burundi